Reilly Walsh (born April 21, 1999) is an American professional ice hockey defenseman for the Utica Comets of the American Hockey League (AHL) as a prospect for the New Jersey Devils of the National Hockey League (NHL).

Playing career
Walsh was drafted by the New Jersey Devils in the third round (81st overall) of the 2017 NHL Entry Draft. On August 10, 2020, he signed a three-year, entry-level contract with the Devils. Walsh made his NHL debut for the Devils on April 26, 2022, against the Ottawa Senators and recorded his first NHL assist.

Career statistics

Regular season and playoffs

International

Awards and honours

References

External links
 

1999 births
Living people
Binghamton Devils players
Chicago Steel players
Harvard Crimson men's ice hockey players
New Jersey Devils draft picks
New Jersey Devils players
People from Falmouth, Massachusetts
Tri-City Storm players
Utica Comets players